Hamburg Airport , known in German as Flughafen Hamburg, is a major international airport in Hamburg, the second-largest city in Germany. Since November 2016 the airport has been christened after the former German chancellor Helmut Schmidt. It was formerly named Hamburg-Fuhlsbüttel Airport, a name still sometimes used.

Hamburg Airport is the fifth-busiest of Germany's commercial airports measured by the number of passengers and counted 17,231,687 passengers and 156,388 aircraft movements in 2018. As of July 2017, it featured flights to more than 130 mostly European metropolitan and leisure destinations as well as two long-haul routes to Dubai and Tehran. The airport is equipped to handle wide-bodied aircraft including the Airbus A380.

Hamburg's other airport, Hamburg Finkenwerder Airport where the Airbus factory is located, is not open to commercial traffic.

History

Early years

The airport was opened in January 1911 from private funding by the Hamburger Luftschiffhallen GmbH (HLG), making it the oldest international airport in the world to still be in operation and the second oldest airport in the country after Tempelhof Airport. The original site comprised 45 hectares, and during its early days was primarily used for airship flights. In 1913 the site was expanded to 60 hectares, the northern part being used for airship operations while the southeast area was used for fixed-wing aircraft.

During the First World War, the airship hangar was used extensively by the German military, until it was destroyed by fire in 1916.

During the British occupation, beginning in 1945, the airport was given its current name, Hamburg Airport. It was used extensively during the Berlin Airlift in 1948 as a staging area, as the northern air corridor went between Hamburg and West Berlin.

When Lufthansa launched passenger operations in 1955, Hamburg was used as a hub until Frankfurt Airport took over due to growth constraints posed by its location in the city. Lufthansa Technik still maintains a large presence at the airport due to the early activities of the airline at the airport. In October 1959 Pan American World Airways was the first airline to start scheduled service with jet aircraft to Hamburg, the routing was New York – London – Hamburg – Copenhagen flown with Boeing 707.

In the 1960s discussions began with the aim of moving the airport to Heidmoor near Kaltenkirchen. Among the reasons cited were limited expansion possibilities, capacity constraints due to crossing runways, and noise. Lufthansa had introduced the Boeing 707 in 1960, which made more noise than previous piston-engined aircraft. The plans were dropped, owing both to bad experiences in other cities where airports had been moved far from city centres, and to Lufthansa's move to Frankfurt.

In 1980 Northwest Orient started flights to Hamburg, originating from Minneapolis with a stop in London Gatwick. In 1981 they introduced a second flight from New York JFK via Copenhagen to Hamburg. All flights were operated with Boeing 747 aircraft. After Northwest Orient received traffic rights to serve Frankfurt they discontinued all flights to Hamburg from early 1985.

In April 1985 Pan American World Airways started a daily non-stop flight from New York JFK to Hamburg, operated with Boeing 747. This was Pan Am's first non-stop service from the US to Hamburg. Starting February 1986 Pan Am also used their new long-range Airbus A310-200 on the route, which made it one of the first ETOPS routes across the Atlantic. In 1988 Japan Air Lines suspended their flights from Tokyo to Hamburg after serving the route for 24 years. One year later in 1989 Lufthansa suspended all flights between Hamburg and Tokyo after almost 30 years of service, which was the last route from Hamburg to the far east.

In May 1989 American Airlines started a daily service from New York JFK via Brussels to Hamburg, and Delta Air Lines started a daily service from Atlanta via London Gatwick to Hamburg. American Airlines suspended their service after a year due to shortage of aircraft after the purchase of Eastern Air Lines' South America routes, Delta upgraded the Atlanta flight to a daily non-stop service with an extension to Berlin-Tegel from May 1991, and also served New York JFK – Hamburg from November 1991 after taking over Pan Am's North Atlantic route network.

Development since the 1990s
In March 1990 Lufthansa launched a daily flight from Hamburg to Newark and added another non-stop flight to Miami in 1992. This lasted for only one summer season and was then suspended together with the Newark flight in late 1992, which left Delta Air Lines alone in this market with their Atlanta and New York flights. From early 1993 to late 1994 South African Airways operated flights from Cape Town via Johannesburg and Munich to Hamburg. In the mid 90s Delta Air Lines experienced financial troubles and had to consolidate their fleet and route network. Hamburg was among the cities in Europe that were cut completely in late 1995. From 1996 Canada 3000 started summer seasonal flights to Hamburg, and until their bankruptcy in late 2001 they served Toronto to Hamburg via Halifax and Vancouver to Hamburg via Calgary. In May 1998 Delta Air Lines relaunched daily non-stop flights between Atlanta and Hamburg. However this route only operated until early 2000. A combination of a then too large business class in their Boeing 767-300ER aircraft and the foundation of the SkyTeam alliance made Delta cancel this service again.

In the early 1990s, the airport had begun extensive modernisation. The plan, called HAM21, included a new 500m pier extension, a new terminal (Terminal 1), and the Airport Plaza between Terminals 1 and 2, which includes a consolidated security area. The airport's shareholders are the City of Hamburg and AviAlliance.

In May 2005 airTransat started a seasonal flight between Toronto and Hamburg. In June that year Continental Airlines started a daily non-stop flight between Newark and Hamburg, Emirates started its then daily Dubai to Hamburg service in March 2006. In 2011 China Eastern Airlines added Hamburg to their route network. However, due to the lack of traffic rights they could only add an extension to their existing Shanghai to Frankfurt flights. The flight initially operated once a week only, and was later increased to twice a week. The stop in Frankfurt and the low frequency did not appeal enough to business travellers so China Eastern suspended the route in 2013.

The Radisson Blu Hotel Hamburg Airport was added in 2009, combined with new roadside access and a station with connection to the city's rapid transit system (Hamburg S-Bahn).

In January 2016, TUIfly announced it was leaving Hamburg Airport entirely due to increasing competition from low-cost carriers. While the summer seasonal routes would not resume, all remaining destinations were cancelled by March 2016. A few weeks later, it was officially announced that the airport was to be named after Helmut Schmidt, a former senator of Hamburg and chancellor of West Germany. On 10 November 2016, the airport was renamed Hamburg Airport Helmut Schmidt.

In October 2016, Air Berlin announced the closure of its maintenance facilities at the airport, due to cost-cutting and restructuring measures.

In June 2017, easyJet announced it would close its base at Hamburg by March 2018 as part of a refocus on other base airports. While over half of the former services were cut, several routes remained in place as they are served from other easyJet bases. In October 2018, United Airlines announced the end of its seasonal service to Newark, leaving the airport with only three long-haul routes, all to the Middle East, and no direct services to North America. The route was inaugurated by Continental Airlines back in 2005 and switched from year-round to seasonal in 2017 Also in October 2018 Emirates switched one of the two daily flights from Dubai to A380-service. This was the first ever commercial A380 service to Hamburg. The second daily flight remains operated by Boeing 777-300ER aircraft.

In January 2020, Ryanair also closed its Hamburg base due to airport operating costs, late delivery of the Boeing 737-Max aircraft, and its general downsizing of its German operations.

Facilities

Hamburg Airport originally covered . As of July 2016, the airport had only three routes served with wide-body aircraft; however, during that year three gates were upgraded with double-jet bridges to provide faster boarding and de-boarding for large planes like the Airbus A380. The runways, taxiways and aprons can accommodate large aircraft, including the Airbus A380. Emirates replaced one Boeing 777 with A380 aircraft on the route. On 28 May 2018, Emirates announced it would commence services from Dubai International Airport to Hamburg with the A380.

Terminals

Hamburg has two terminals, Terminal 1 and Terminal 2, connected by the Airport Plaza and the baggage claim area that extends through the lower levels of all three buildings. These three buildings were designed by Gerkan, Marg and Partners. Both terminals have a high, curved ceiling designed to emulate the shape of a wing. In all buildings level 1 is the departure level, while level 0 is arrivals. Hamburg Airport offers 12 baggage claim belts on the arrivals level.

The Airport Plaza hosts the central security check as well as shops, restaurants, lounges and other service facilities. It houses the S-Bahn station (suburban railway) and was completed in December 2008.

Terminal 1
Terminal 1 was completed in 2005 and is highly similar to Terminal 2 in terms of design and size. It has numerous energy and water saving features like rain water collection for use in restrooms and a ThermoLabyrinth, which uses ground temperature to help regulate the building's temperature and reduce loads on the air conditioning systems. Terminal 1 houses most of the airlines including those from the Oneworld and SkyTeam alliances.

Terminal 2
Terminal 2 (despite its name, the older facility) was completed in 1993. It houses Lufthansa with its Star Alliance partners, amongst others.

Airlines and destinations
The following airlines offer regular scheduled and charter flights at Hamburg Airport:

Statistics

Passengers and movements

Busiest routes

Ground transportation

Train

S-Bahn service S1, operated by Deutsche Bahn operates every ten minutes between the airport, Ohlsdorf, Wandsbek, Hamburg central station, Altona, Blankenese and Wedel. It is part of the HVV fare organisation offering tickets for all modes of public transportation in Hamburg. Going towards the airport, S1 trains split at Ohlsdorf station, with one portion going to the airport and the other going to Poppenbüttel.

Car
By road, the airport can be reached from Federal Motorway A7 using the state motorway B433, which is the third ring road. Motorists from the east of the city must drive through Hamburg.

Bus
The airport is also linked by some local bus routes to nearby areas as well as regular coach services to the cities of Kiel and Neumünster.

Trivia
 Hamburg Airport is the inspiration for the world's largest miniature airport, named Knuffingen Airport, part of Miniatur Wunderland.
 From 1999 until 2021, a former Lufthansa Boeing 707 was on public display on the airport's grounds. In February 2021, the airport authority announced its demolition due to cost cutting measures. It was originally operated by Lufthansa from 1960 to 1975 and gifted to the airport after being used as a training aircraft.
Hamburg Airport serves as the opening scene in the renowned novel Norwegian Wood, written by Japanese author Haruki Murakami.

See also
 Transport in Germany
 List of airports in Germany
 Hamburg Finkenwerder Airport

References

External links

 Official website
 
 

Airports established in 1911
Airports in Hamburg
Buildings and structures in Hamburg-Nord
Gerkan, Marg and Partners buildings
1911 establishments in Germany
Helmut Schmidt